Parnon or Parnonas or Malevos (Μαλεβός) is a mountain range, or massif, on the east of the Laconian plain and the Evrotas valley. It is visible from Athens above the top of the Argive mountains. The western part is in the Laconia prefecture and the northeastern part is in the Arcadia prefecture. The Parnon range separates Laconia from Arcadia. Its summit offers panoramic views of southeastern Arcadia and South Kynouria and much of Laconia that includes the northern and the central portions and reaches as far as the Taygetos mountains.  It also views a part of the central Arcadia and the southern Argolis prefectures.  It views the Myrtoan and the Laconian Gulfs.

Geography

Physical

The Parnon Massif is divided into three parts. The northernmost, which is the highest, runs  from just north of Ano Doliana in North Kynouria, eastern Arcadia, southeast to Platanaki Pass. Platanaki, ancient Glyppia, is on the ancient route from Therapnes to South Kynouria between the peaks of Parnon, and Psaris, . Below it are forests of Black Pine and fir; above it, grasslands.

The remaining , even lower in altitude but still mountainous, runs from Kounouria to the sea at Epidaurus Limera, which is in Monemvasia. Parnon proper does not extend into the Malea Peninsula.

In addition to the range of Parnon, two forelands can also be defined, east and west. Kynouria is located in the east foreland.

Political
The nearest places are:
 Ano Doliana, north
 Agios Petros, north
 Kastanitsa, northeast
 Agios Vasileios, east
 Platanaki, east
 Palaiochori, east
 Kosmas, southeast
 Geraki, south
 Kallithea, southwest
 Vamvakou, west

Geology
The Parnon range is predominantly limestone. The mountain is home to the fifth deepest cave in Greece, the Peleta Sinkhole (depth as of 2006 is -543 m) and the impressive vertical cave Propantes (-360m).

See also

 List of mountains in Greece

References

External links
 Parnon Trail
 Greek Mountain Flora
 
 

Landforms of Arcadia, Peloponnese
Landforms of Laconia
Mountain ranges of Greece
Landforms of Peloponnese (region)